Procaris ascensionis is a species of shrimp, known only from two saltwater pools on Ascension Island; the larger of the two pools is about  in diameter and contains  of water.

References

Decapods
Fauna of Ascension Island
Crustaceans described in 1972
Taxa named by Raymond B. Manning